Agaricophagus cephalotes is a species of beetle belonging to the family Leiodidae.

It is native to Europe and Greenland.

References

Leiodidae